Mark Stam (born 21 August 1997 in Chişinău, Moldova) is a Moldovan singer-songwriter. He rose to prominence after his 2013 participation in Moldova are talent, when he teamed up with Spoiala Brothers, and would later sign a record deal with Global Records. In 2018, Stam achieved significant success in Romania with "Impar", peaking at number one on the country's national Airplay 100 ranking.

Career
Stam was born Marius Stamatin on 21 August 1997 in Chişinău, Moldova. He showed special interest in music at an early age, and went on to teach himself to play guitar and piano by watching YouTube tutorials. In 2013, Stam took part in Moldova are talent in 2013. As part of the label Spoiala Brothers, the singer achieved notable success in his native Moldova with his early releases, but was introduced to the Romanian public by Alina Eremia, whom he collaborated with on "Doar noi" (2018). The single achieved significant radio and television airplay there. He soon after signed a record deal with Global Records. In 2018, Stam was nominated in the Best Male Artist category at the Elle Style Awards România, and also appeared on the Elle Man magazine cover for their November issue. He also posed for Cosmopolitan the same month. On 25 November 2018, his single "Impar" reached number one on Romania's national Airplay 100 chart.

Personal life and musical style
Stam has residences in both Moldova and Romania. His releases approach a pop style, with heavy influences of rhythm and blues (R&B), soul and folk music. Stam cites Ed Sheeran and Bruno Mars as musical influencers.

Singles

Awards and nominations

References

21st-century Moldovan male singers
1997 births
Living people
Global Records artists